The Castleton Spartans are the athletic teams that represent Castleton University. The Spartans compete in 28 National Collegiate Athletic Association (NCAA) Division III intercollegiate sports.

Sports sponsored

NCAA Division III sports

Men's basketball 
From 1983 to 1986, Stan Van Gundy (later head coach of the Orlando Magic and the Detroit Pistons) coached Men's Basketball at Castleton.

Men's soccer 
Castleton's men's soccer team were declared 1963 NAIA co-champions (along with Earlham College of Indiana) after the championship and consolation games at Frostburg State University in Maryland were cancelled due to snow.

Ice hockey 
The men's and women's Castleton Spartans hockey teams compete at the Spartan Arena in the site of the former Diamond Run Mall in Rutland. They compete in the New England Hockey Conference (NEHC),

Football 
The Castleton Spartans football team represents the school in NCAA Division III. The team has been coached by Tony Volpone since 2014. Volpone replaced Marc Klatt, who resigned in December 2013. It has been part of the Eastern Collegiate Football Conference (ECFC) since its inaugural season in 2009.

References 

College sports teams in Vermont